Alejandro Miguel San Martín (January 6, 1959) is an Argentine engineer of NASA and a science educator. He is best known for his work as Chief Engineer for the Guidance, Navigation, and Control system in the latest missions to Mars. His best known contribution is the Sky Crane system, of which he is coinventor, used in the Curiosity mission for the descent of the rover.

In addition to his work as an engineer, he is dedicated to giving presentations about the work he does with his team at NASA. He has participated as a speaker at various events such as Campus Party, Robotics Day, Real Talks Atlanta and TEDx Río de la Plata, among other conferences. He is featured in the NASA video "Curiosity Seven Minutes of Terror" along with other Curiosity engineers.

Early life and career 

He left Argentina after he graduated from industrial school, moving to the United States to get a bachelor's degree in electrical engineering from Syracuse University College of Engineering and Computer Science, being named Engineering Student of the Year. He completed his master's degree at the Massachusetts Institute of Technology.

In various interviews he said that he decided to be a space engineer on a winter's night in 1976 at his parents’ farm, while he listened to the BBC on short wave reporting the arrival of the Viking mission to Mars.

He started working for the NASA Jet Propulsion Laboratory in 1985, where he participated in the Magellan mission to Venus and Cassini mission to Saturn. Later in the Pathfinder mission he was named Chief Engineer for the Guidance, Navigation, and Control system, which landed Sojourner rover. In the same role he was part of the Spirit and Opportunity missions in 2004. He helped to develop the Sky Crane system which landed Curiosity on Mars as part of the Mars Science Laboratory mission, and with his team at JPL he also worked on the software for the landing.

He is a member of the NASA National Engineering and Safety Center. 

In February 2019, he was elected as member of the National Academy of Engineering.

Awards 
 1998, 2013: NASA Exceptional Engineering Achievement Medal
 2004: NASA Exceptional Service Medal
 2007: NASA Group Achievement Award
 2013: Outstanding Engineering Achievement Merit Award - The Engineers' Council
 2013: Collier Trophy for the Curiosity Team - National Aeronautic Association
 2013: National Air and Space Museum Trophy for Current Achievement - Smithsonian Institution
 2013: Premio Konex: Diploma al Mérito en Desarrollo Tecnológico - La Fundación Konex
 2013: Premio Konex de Platino: Desarrollo Tecnológico - La Fundación Konex
 2013: Magellan Award for Outstanding Senior JPL Management - The Jet Propulsion Laboratory
 2013: NASA Group Achievement Award: MSL Guidance, Navigation, and Control System Team
 2013: NASA Group Achievement Award: MSL Entry, Descent, and Landing Team
 2013: NASA Group Achievement Award: MSL Project Operations Team
 2013: JPL Fellow - The Jet Propulsion Laboratory
 2013: Best Paper Award: 23rd AAS/AIAA Space Flight Mechanics Conference - AAS/AIAA
 2019: He was elected a member of the National Academy of Engineering for technical contributions and leadership in guidance, navigation, and control leading to successful Mars entry, descent, and landing.

See also
Adam Steltzner, lead engineer of the Mars Science Laboratory Curiosity rover Entry, Descent and Landing phase

References

External links 

 https://migonmars.wordpress.com

1959 births
Argentine aerospace engineers
Electronics engineers
Living people
Massachusetts Institute of Technology alumni
NASA people
People from Villa Regina
Recipients of the NASA Exceptional Service Medal
Syracuse University College of Engineering and Computer Science alumni